Velupillai Sivayogan is a Sri Lankan Tamil engineer, politician and provincial councillor.

Sivayogan contested the 2013 provincial council election as one of the Tamil National Alliance's candidates in Jaffna District and was elected to the Northern Provincial Council. After the election he was appointed to assist the Chief Minister on housing, roads, bridges and ferries. He took his oath as provincial councillor in front of Chief Minister C. V. Vigneswaran at Veerasingam Hall on 11 October 2013.

References

Illankai Tamil Arasu Kachchi politicians
Living people
Members of the Northern Provincial Council
People from Northern Province, Sri Lanka
Sri Lankan Tamil engineers
Sri Lankan Tamil politicians
Tamil National Alliance politicians
Year of birth missing (living people)